KCIN (94.9 FM) is a radio station broadcasting a country music format. Licensed to Cedar City, Utah, United States, the station is currently owned by Townsquare Media.

History
The station went on the air as KBRE-FM on May 10, 1974. It was owned by New Era Broadcasting Company. On May 29, 2001, the station changed its call sign to KXBN, and on September 1, 2006, to the current KCIN.

These call letters were used from 1961 until 1995 in Victorville, California.

On January 1, 2020, the stations changed their branding from "Big Kickin' Country" to "107.3/94.9 New Country".

On October 10, 2022 the stations rebranded as "Cat Country 107.3/94.9".

Previous logo

References

External links

CIN
Radio stations established in 1974
1974 establishments in Utah
Cedar City, Utah
Country radio stations in the United States
Townsquare Media radio stations